Faculdade de Telêmaco Borba (abbreviated FATEB) is a Brazilian Higher Education institution, based in Telêmaco Borba, Paraná (state). It was founded in 2000.

References

External links

 Official FATEB Website 

Educational institutions established in 2000
Education in Telêmaco Borba
2000 establishments in Brazil